This is a list of public schools in Omaha, Nebraska, United States. The local school district, Omaha Public Schools, operates most public schools in Omaha, with the exception of Westside Community Schools and Millard Public Schools.

Elementary schools

Middle schools

High schools

Alternative Programs

Historical Schools
The Board of Education in Omaha has operated a variety of schools since the city's founding in 1854. The first school in Omaha, a one-room schoolhouse, was opened on the southwest corner of Jefferson Square. After a brief closure in 1861, Omaha Public Schools formed again in 1863, and has operated continuously since. The following schools in Omaha were opened and closed since 1863.

See also
Historical schools in North Omaha
Historical schools in East Omaha
Education in Omaha, Nebraska
Education in North Omaha

Notes and references

External links
Omaha Public Schools

Omaha Public Schools
Schools
Omaha